George Harry Swan (born 12 September 1994) is an English former professional footballer who played as a defender for Wolverhampton Wanderers and York City. Swan retired due to injury and became an agent.

Career
Born in Plymouth, Devon, Swan is the son of former professional footballer Peter Swan. He started his career with Leeds United's youth system in 2005 at the age of 10. He signed for Manchester City's youth system in their under-14 squad in 2009, and was named captain of the under-18 squad in 2012. Swan went on loan with Tippeligaen club Strømsgodset in June 2012, before joining Championship club Sheffield Wednesday on a youth loan in September 2013. He was hindered by injuries at City and was released by the club at the end of the 2013–14 season. He went on trial with his former club Leeds in July 2014.

Swan signed for Championship club Wolverhampton Wanderers on a three-month contract on 9 September 2014, and was placed in their under-21 squad. Before his release by Wolves in April 2014, he trained with York City in the closing weeks of 2014–15. He signed for the League Two club on 11 June 2015 on a one-year contract. Swan missed the start of 2015–16 with thigh and calf problems and only made his debut on 10 November 2015 in York's 2–1 away defeat to Barnsley in the Football League Trophy Northern section quarter-final. He was released by York when his contract expired at the end of 2015–16.

Style of play
Swan started his career as a striker, before moving into defence as a ball-playing centre-back. He was a commanding centre-back with the ability to read the game, and his strengths included winning headers and his timing of tackles.

Personal life
After retiring from professional football because of persistent injuries, Swan became the youngest agent in football.

Career statistics

References

External links

1994 births
Living people
Footballers from Plymouth, Devon
English footballers
Association football defenders
Leeds United F.C. players
Manchester City F.C. players
Wolverhampton Wanderers F.C. players
York City F.C. players
English Football League players
British sports agents
Association football agents